Lance Louw (born 12 May 1986 in Kimberley, South Africa) is a South African field hockey player. At the 2012 Summer Olympics, he competed for the national team in the men's tournament.

References

External links

Living people
South African male field hockey players
Field hockey players at the 2012 Summer Olympics
Olympic field hockey players of South Africa
1986 births
Alumni of Parktown Boys' High School
Sportspeople from Kimberley, Northern Cape